Francis Elliott may refer to:

 Francis Elliott (archdeacon),  Archdeacon of Berbice from 1908 to 1911
 Francis Elliott (journalist), British journalist
 Francis Perry Elliott, American writer and educator

See also 
 Francis Elliott Drouet (1907–1982), American phycologist
 Francis Elliot (1851–1940), British diplomat